Kliquit or Lekwe't or t'lakwitan, meaning "seaweed body" was a Kwakwaka'wakw village of the Mamalilikulla subgroup located on the north shore of Knight Inlet, east of Hoeya Sound in British Columbia, Canada. The Mamalilikulla used it as a base for fishing and trapping.

See also
List of Kwakwaka'wakw villages

References

Kwakwaka'wakw villages
Central Coast of British Columbia